Lu Yee Chun) is a 2016 Burmese drama television series. It aired on MRTV-4, from 13 April to 6 July 2016, on Mondays to Fridays at 19:00 for 60 episodes.

Cast
Myat Thu Kyaw as Zwe Naing
Kyaw Hsu as Pyone Maung
May Mi Kyaw Kyaw as See Sar Oo
Sithu Win as Nanda Kyaw
Chue Lay as Ngwe Hnin Phyu
Hsu Waddy as Mya Thidar
Zu Zu Zan as Hla Lun Swe
Wyne Swe Yi as Khayay
Hein Htet as Nay Thway

References

External links

Burmese television series
MRTV (TV network) original programming